This is about the lines in the West Midlands. The name also sometimes refers to the lines through Snow Hill Tunnel in London, now part of the Thameslink route.

The Snow Hill Lines is the collective name for the railway lines running through Birmingham Snow Hill, and  stations in Birmingham, United Kingdom. They form an important part of the suburban rail network of Birmingham, Warwickshire and Worcestershire. All other lines to/through Birmingham use  station. The Snow Hill lines carry around 20% of the daily rail services into Birmingham; the remainder use New Street. 

Historically, the lines running through Snow Hill station were built by the Great Western Railway, and so they are largely separate from the lines running into New Street station, which were built by the London and North Western Railway and Midland Railway.

The original Snow Hill station was closed in 1972. The Snow Hill lines in their present form came into being between 1987 and 1995, when Snow Hill station, and the line through to Smethwick was reopened, in order to create a new cross-city rail service via Snow Hill and Moor Street stations. The former line to Wolverhampton was reopened as the Midland Metro tram line in 1999.

Lines
The three Snow Hill lines are:

Birmingham to Worcester via Kidderminster Line

It was reopened to Snow Hill in 1995 as part of the "Jewellery Line" project.

Chiltern Main Line

This is a regional main line with services to London Marylebone.

North Warwickshire Line

The line was formerly a through main line running south to Cheltenham, but has been a dead end branch since the 1970s. A spur line from Hatton allows some services to run via Solihull.

Rolling stock and operators

Unlike the lines to/through New Street station, the lines are not electrified, and are operated by diesel multiple units. West Midlands Railway, who operate the local services on the routes, mainly use  DMUs. These replaced the older  in 2011. Chiltern Railways use  and  diesel multiple units, and  locomotives with Mark 3 coaches. However, electrification is a future aspiration of Network Rail and Chiltern Railways.

Services

West Midlands Railway
The local services on the Snow Hill Lines are closely integrated.

Chiltern Railways
Chiltern Railways also run a two-hourly local service from Moor Street to Leamington. In peak hours some Chiltern services to or from London continue to Kidderminster.

Midland Metro

The Midland Metro runs into Snow Hill, but it is not considered one of the Snow Hill Lines as it is a light rail/tram line. However it runs mostly along the trackbed of the former Birmingham Snow Hill to Wolverhampton Low Level Line.

Future

In October 2018, as part of a 30-year strategy of Transport in the West Midlands several interventions were proposed between 2018 and 2047. By 2026 it was proposed that trains would be lengthened, improvements to evening services (from May 2019), investigations of a case to extend services to Brierley Hill and West Midlands Safari Park and reopening platform 4 at Snow Hill. By 2034, it was proposed that Birmingham to Rowley Regis, Dorridge, Whitlocks End and Stratford upon Avon services would be increased which would see a new turn back facilities at Rowley Regis and capacity interventions at Moor Street and Snow Hill. Beyond 2034, it was proposed that there may be capacity improvements between Leamington Spa and Birmingham, a new semi-fast service between Birmingham and Oxford via Solihull, local service frequency increases and Safari Park service increases.

See also
Transport in Birmingham
Urban rail in the United Kingdom
Honeybourne Line

References

Rail transport in Birmingham, West Midlands
Rail transport in Sandwell
Rail transport in Dudley
Rail transport in Warwickshire
Rail transport in Worcestershire